International South Asia Forum (INSAF) is a Canada-based group that seeks to promote secularism, democracy, human rights and social justice. Their focus is in South Asian countries such as India, Pakistan, Bangladesh and Sri Lanka.

Founding
INSAF was founded in 1999 at a conference held in Montreal, Canada, on September 4 and 5.

Location
International South Asia Forum 254 Kensington Ave, Westmount, QC, Canada H3Z 2G6

Publications
Two major publications
 Insaf bulletin.
 Ghadar ("Publication of the Inquilabi Leftists.")

Personalities
The INSAF bulletin is edited by Daya Varma and Vinod Mubayi.

External links
 http://www.insafbulletin.net/
 http://ghadar.insaf.net/

Magazines established in 1999
Political magazines published in Canada
Think tanks based in Canada
1999 establishments in Canada